Between Love and Hate may refer to:
 Between Love and Hate (2006 film), a South Korean film
 Between Love and Hate (1993 film), an American television film

See also
 Entre el amor y el odio (English: Between Love and Hatred), a Mexican telenovela